Leopard catfish may refer to:
 Corydoras trilineatus, the threestripe corydoras
 Corydoras julii
 Perrunichthys perruno